Brian J. Lee (born January 23, 1975) is a former American football player.  He played at the defensive back position for the University of Wyoming Cowboys football team from 1994 to 1997 and led the NCAA with eight interceptions in 1997.  He was also a consensus first-team selection to the 1997 College Football All-America Team.  He was also a first-team Academic All-American in 1997. In 2008, Lee was inducted into the University of Wyoming's Athletic Hall of Fame.  After graduating from Wyoming, Lee became a middle school teacher in Littleton, Colorado.

References

1975 births
Living people
All-American college football players
American football defensive backs
Wyoming Cowboys football players
Players of American football from Colorado
People from Arvada, Colorado